Armes is a surname. Notable people with the name include:
Don Armes (born 1961), American politician
Edward J Armes (born 1923), United States Navy officer
Ethel Armes (1876–1945), American journalist and historian
George Augustus Armes (1844–1919), United States Army officer
Ivan Armes (born 1924), British footballer
Jay J. Armes (born 1932), American amputee and actor (Note: Born as surname "Armas")
John Armes (born 1955), Scottish bishop
Ray Armes (born 1951), British racing driver
Sammy Armes (1908–58), English footballer
Steven Armes, British professor
Sybil Leonard Armes (1914–2007), Baptist author and musician
Teo Armes, born 1977 Norwich